Henry Gartf Holt (January 3, 1840 – February 13, 1926), was an American book publisher and author.

Life and career
Henry Holt was born in Baltimore, Maryland, on January 3, 1840. He graduated from Yale University in 1862. After a year at Columbia Law School he married Mary Florence West and left school for work.

He joined the publishing company of Frederick Leypoldt in 1866, which  became Henry Holt and Company in 1873. Holt's company specialized in publishing and did not sell books at retail. He remained active in the company until about 1916.

Seven years after his wife's death, he wed Florence Taber. Holt had 3 sons and 3 daughters. His son Roland Holt married famed dramatist Constance D'Arcy Mackay.  In 1905, Henry Holt's daughters Edith and Winifred co-founded the New York Association for the Blind, now known as Lighthouse International.  Edith continued to be active with this charity, which provided the opportunity for blind people to do useful work.  In response to critics she wrote "Some went as far as to say that it would be cruel to add to the burden of infirmity the burden of labor, as if to be without work were not the heaviest burden mortal could be called upon to endure."

In 1914 Holt founded The Unpopular Review, later renamed The Unpartizan Review, which ceased publication in 1920.

Holt also authored novels. Both Calire (1892) and Sturmsee: Man and Man (1905) were first published anonymously and then reissued under his name. The New York Times described them: "In Sturmsee the economic problems of the present day are treated in an interesting fashion. The theory of 'social service' is set forth in it., and there are many satirical touches. The scope of the other novel, Calmire, is somewhat broader."

Holt served on the Simplified Spelling Board, and was its President and the man to whom the Board's founding benefactor Andrew Carnegie addressed his 25 February 1915 letter expressing dissatisfaction with the progress of the board, saying of the board that "a more useless body of men never came into association, judging from the effects they produce."

Holt published his autobiography, Garrulities of an Octogenarian Editor in 1923.

He died at his home in New York City on February 13, 1926, and was buried in Green-Wood Cemetery.

Works
Fiction
Calire (1892)
Sturmsee: Man and Man (1905)
Steppenwolf (1926)
Non-fiction
Talks on Civics (1901)
On the Cosmic Relations (1914)
Garrulities of an Octogenarian Editor (1923)

References

Further reading
Henry Holt, Garrulities Of An Octogenarian Editor. With Other Essays Somewhat Biographical and Autobiographical, Boston and New York: Houghton Mifflin Company, 1923.
Charles A. Madison, The Owl Among Colophons: Henry Holt as Publisher and Editor, New York: Holt, Rinehart and Winston, 1966.

External links

Brief biography

 
Henry Holt autograph letter 
Holt & Co. history (abstract)
American literature is going to the dogs; it is the fault of magazines, says Henry Holt, who laments their exploitation of names and accuses government of unduly favoring them. New York Times, January 9, 1916.
New York Times Article - Residence of Holt
 

American book publishing company founders
19th-century American novelists
20th-century American novelists
American male novelists
19th-century American male writers
20th-century American male writers
Novelists from New York (state)
Novelists from Maryland
Writers from New Rochelle, New York
Writers from Baltimore
Businesspeople from New Rochelle, New York
Columbia Law School alumni
Yale University alumni
Burials at Green-Wood Cemetery
1840 births
1926 deaths